Leslie J. Parent is an American microbiologist and immunologist currently professor and vice dean of the College of Medicine at Pennsylvania State University and an Elected Fellow of the American Association for the Advancement of Science and American Society for Microbiology.

Education
She earned her M.D. in 1987 at Duke University followed by residency and training at Duke University Medical Center and Penn State College of Medicine.

Research
Her research involves virology, retrovirus duplicating and biology. Her highest cited paper is "Positionally independent and exchangeable late budding functions of the Rous sarcoma virus and human immunodeficiency virus Gag proteins" cited at 278 times, according to Google Scholar.

Selected publications
Bewley MC, Reinhart L, Stake MS, Nadaraia-Hoke S, Parent LJ, Flanagan JM. A non-cleavable hexahistidine affinity tag at the carboxyl-terminus of the HIV-1 Pr55Gag polyprotein alters nucleic acid binding properties. Protein Expr Purif. 2017 Feb; 130:137-145. .
Kaddis Maldonado RJ, Parent LJ. Orchestrating the Selection and Packaging of Genomic RNA by Retroviruses: An Ensemble of Viral and Host Factors. Viruses. 2016 Sep 20; 8(9). .
Rye-McCurdy T, Olson ED, Liu S, Binkley C, Reyes JP, Thompson BR, Flanagan JM, Parent LJ, Musier-Forsyth K. Functional Equivalence of Retroviral MA Domains in Facilitating Psi RNA Binding Specificity by Gag. Viruses. 2016 Sep 19; 8(9). .
Stake M, Singh D, Singh G, Marcela Hernandez J, Kaddis Maldonado R, Parent LJ, Boris-Lawrie K. HIV-1 and two avian retroviral 5' untranslated regions bind orthologous human and chicken RNA binding proteins. Virology. 2015 Dec; 486:307-20. ;  [Available on 12/01/16].

References

Fellows of the American Association for the Advancement of Science
Pennsylvania State University faculty
American microbiologists
American immunologists
Living people
Year of birth missing (living people)
Duke University School of Medicine alumni
American virologists